USS R-25 (SS-102) was an R-class coastal and harbor defense submarine built for the United States Navy during World War I.

Description
The R-boats built by Lake Torpedo Boat Company (R-21 through R-27) are sometimes considered a separate class from those of the other builders. They displaced  on the surface and  submerged. The R-class submarines had a crew of 3 officers and 23 enlisted men.

For surface running, the boats were powered by two  diesel engines, each driving one propeller shaft. When submerged each propeller was driven by a  electric motor. They could reach  on the surface and  underwater.

The boats were armed with four 21-inch (53.3 cm) torpedo tubes in the bow. They carried four reloads, for a total of eight torpedoes. The R-class submarines were also armed with a single 3"/50 caliber deck gun.

Construction and career
R-25 was laid down on 26 April 1917 by the Lake Torpedo Boat Company in Bridgeport, Connecticut. She was launched on 15 May 1919 sponsored by Mrs. Richard H. M. Robinson, and commissioned on 23 October 1919 with Lieutenant Commander Charles A. Lockwood, Jr., in command. At the end of November, R-25 got underway for her homeport, Coco Solo, Panama Canal Zone. Arriving 11 January 1920, she was given hull classification symbol SS-102 in July and, except for overhaul periods at Balboa and on the East Coast, operated in the waters off the Panama Canal Zone until the fall of 1923. In November of that year she arrived at Philadelphia, Pennsylvania, and underwent inactivation overhaul. On 21 June 1924 she was decommissioned after just over four-and-a-half years of service. She was laid up at League Island until was struck from the Naval Vessel Register on 9 May 1930 and sold for scrap the following July.

Notes

References

External links
 

Ships built in Bridgeport, Connecticut
United States R-class submarines
1919 ships